Zacharia Douglas Evans (born 3 May 1991) is a Welsh footballer who plays as a midfielder for Newtown.

Playing career
On 13 August 2010, Presteigne-born Evans joined Hereford United of League Two on a one-year deal. He made his debut in the Football League Trophy second round 3–0 defeat by Exeter City on 5 October 2010, replacing Richard Rose on 56 minutes but was released in January 2011.

Evans joined Welsh Premier League club Newtown towards the end of the 2009–2010. He failed to score his first goal for Newtown. Saturday 17 December 2011 as a penalty against Airbus UK in a Welsh Premier League match.

References

External links
 Profile at the Official Cardiff City site
 Profile at the Official Hereford United site
 

1991 births
Living people
People from Presteigne
Sportspeople from Powys
Welsh footballers
Association football midfielders
Cardiff City F.C. players
Hereford United F.C. players
Newtown A.F.C. players
Cymru Premier players